Christopher Maurice Brown (born May 5, 1989) is an American singer, songwriter, dancer, and actor. According to Billboard, Brown is one of the most successful R&B singers of his generation, having often been referred to by many contemporaries as the "King of R&B". His musical style has been defined as polyhedric, with his R&B being characterized by several influences from other genres, mainly hip hop and pop music. His lyrics develop predominantly over themes of sex, romance, fast life, desire, regret, and emotional conflict. Brown has gained a cult following and wide comparisons to Michael Jackson for his stage presence.

In 2004, Brown signed with Jive Records, and released his self-titled debut studio album the following year, which was later certified triple platinum by the Recording Industry Association of America (RIAA). With his debut single "Run It!" peaking atop the Billboard Hot 100, Brown became the first male artist since 1995 to have his debut single top the chart. His second album, Exclusive (2007), was met with even bigger commercial success worldwide, and it spawned his second Billboard Hot 100 number one "Kiss Kiss". In 2009, Brown pled guilty to felony assault of his then-girlfriend, singer Rihanna. In the same year, he released his third album, Graffiti, which was considered to be a commercial failure compared to his previous works. Following Graffiti, Brown released his fourth album F.A.M.E. (2011), which became his first album to top the Billboard 200. The album contained the commercially successful singles: "Yeah 3x", "Look at Me Now" and "Beautiful People", and earned him the Grammy Award for Best R&B Album. His fifth album, Fortune, released in 2012, also topped the Billboard 200.

Following the releases of X (2014) and Royalty (2015), his 2017 double-disc album, Heartbreak on a Full Moon, consisting of 45 tracks, was certified gold by the Recording Industry Association of America for combined sales and album-equivalent units of over 500,000 units after one week, and was later certified Double Platinum by the Recording Industry Association of America. Brown's ninth studio album Indigo was released in 2019, also debuted atop on the Billboard 200. It included the Drake featured track "No Guidance" which reached the top five on the Billboard Hot 100 and broke the record for the longest-running number one on Billboard's R&B/Hip-Hop Airplay chart. Its chart success was outdone with the single "Go Crazy" released the following year, alongside Young Thug as part of their collaborative mixtape Slime & B (2020).

Brown has sold over 197 million records worldwide, making him one of the world's best-selling music artists. He is also one of the highest-grossing African American touring artists of all time. Brown has the most Billboard Hot 100 entries of any male singer in history; as well as the most top 40 hits of any R&B singer in history. Brown was also ranked third on Billboard's top R&B/Hip-Hop artists of the 2010s decade chart, behind Drake and Rihanna in first and second, respectively. Throughout his career, Brown has won several awards, including a Grammy Award, eighteen BET Awards, four Billboard Music Awards, and fourteen Soul Train Music Awards. Brown has also pursued an acting career. In 2007, he made his on-screen feature film debut in Stomp the Yard, and appeared as a guest on the television series The O.C. Other films Brown has appeared in include This Christmas (2007), Takers (2010), Think Like a Man (2012), and Battle of the Year (2013) and She Ball (2020).

Early life
Christopher Maurice Brown was born on May 5, 1989, in the small town of Tappahannock, Virginia, to Joyce Hawkins, a former day care center director, and Clinton Brown, a corrections officer at a local prison. He has an older sister, Lytrell Bundy, who works in a bank. Music was always present in Brown's life beginning in his childhood. He would listen to soul albums that his parents owned, and eventually began to show interest in the hip-hop scene.

Brown taught himself to sing and dance at a young age and often cites Michael Jackson as his inspiration. He began to perform in his church choir and in several local talent shows. When he mimicked an Usher performance of "My Way", his mother recognized his vocal talent, and they began to look for the opportunity of a record deal. At the same time, Brown was going through personal issues. His parents had divorced, and his mother's boyfriend terrified him by subjecting her to domestic violence.

Career

2002–2004: Career beginnings
At age 13, Brown was discovered by Hitmission Records, a local production team that visited his father's gas station while searching for new talent. Hitmission's Lamont Fleming provided voice coaching for Brown, and the team helped to arrange a demo package, under the name of "C. Sizzle", and approached contacts in New York, where Brown started to sojourn, to seek a record deal. Brown attended Essex High School in Virginia until late 2004, when he moved to New York to pursue his music career. Tina Davis, senior A&R executive at Def Jam Recordings, was impressed when Brown auditioned in her New York office, and she immediately took him to meet the former president of the Island Def Jam Music Group, Antonio "L.A." Reid, who offered to sign him that day, but Brown refused his proposal. "I knew that Chris had real talent," says Davis. "I just knew I wanted to be part of it."

The negotiations with Def Jam continued for two months, and ended when Davis lost her job due to a corporate merger. Brown asked her to be his manager, and once Davis accepted, she promoted the singer to other labels such as Jive Records, J-Records and Warner Bros. Records. According to Mark Pitts, in an interview with HitQuarters, Davis presented Brown with a video recording, and Pitts' reaction was: "I saw huge potential ... I didn't love all the records, but I loved his voice. It wasn't a problem because I knew that he could sing, and I knew how to make records." Brown ultimately chose Jive due to its successful work with then-young acts such as Britney Spears and Justin Timberlake. Brown stated, "I picked Jive because they had the best success with younger artists in the pop market, [...] I knew I was going to capture my African American audience, but Jive had a lot of strength in the pop area as well as longevity in careers." Brown said that during his permanence in Harlem, when he was trying to get his music heard by major labels, his artistic intention was to both rap and sing on his records, but Jive convinced him to stick to just singing, because he said that "it wasn't acceptable yet" for an R&B singer to also rap on records.

2005–2006: Chris Brown and acting debut

After signing to Jive Records in 2004, Brown began recording his self-titled debut studio album in February 2005. By May, there were 50 songs already recorded, 14 of which were picked to the final track listing. The singer worked with several producers and songwriters—Scott Storch, Cool & Dre, Sean Garrett and Jazze Pha among them—commenting that they "really believed in [him]". Brown co-wrote half of the tracks. "I write about the things that 16 year olds go through every day," says Brown. "Like you just got in trouble for sneaking your girl into the house, or you can't drive, so you steal a car or something." The whole album took less than eight weeks to produce.

Released on November 29, 2005, the self-titled Chris Brown album debuted at number two on the Billboard 200 with first week sales of 154,000 copies. Chris Brown was a commercial success with the time; selling over three million copies in the United States—where it was certified three times platinum by the RIAA—and six million copies worldwide. The album's lead single, "Run It!", made Brown the first male act (since Montell Jordan in 1995) to have his debut single to reach the summit of the Billboard Hot 100—later remaining for four additional weeks. Three of the other singles—"Yo (Excuse Me Miss)", "Gimme That" and "Say Goodbye"—peaked within the top twenty at the same chart.

On June 13, 2006, Brown released a DVD entitled Chris Brown's Journey, which shows footage of him traveling through England and Japan, getting ready for his first visit to the Grammy Awards, behind the scenes of his music videos and bloopers. On August 17, 2006, to further promote the album, Brown began his major co-headlining tour, The Up Close and Personal Tour. Due to the tour, production for his next album was pushed back two months. St. Jude Children's Research Hospital received $10,000 in ticket proceeds from Brown's 2006 "Up Close & Personal" tour. Brown has made appearances on UPN's One on One and The N's Brandon T. Jackson Show on its pilot episode.

2007–2008: Exclusive

In January 2007, Brown landed a small role as a band geek in the fourth season of the American television series The O.C.. Brown then made his film debut in Stomp the Yard, alongside Ne-Yo, Meagan Good and Columbus Short on January 12, 2007. In April 2007, Brown was the opening act for Beyoncé, on the Australian leg of her The Beyoncé Experience tour. On July 9, 2007, Brown was featured in an episode of MTV's My Super Sweet 16 (for the event, it was retitled: Chris Brown: My Super 18) celebrating his eighteenth birthday in New York City.

Shortly after ending his summer tour with Ne-Yo, Brown quickly began production for his second studio album, Exclusive. When the album's lead single, "Wall to Wall", was released, it didn't have a great commercial success, peaking at number 79 on US Billboard Hot 100 chart, and number 22 on the US Hot R&B/Hip-Hop Songs chart, being his lowest charting single at the time. However, "Kiss Kiss", featuring and produced by T-Pain, released as the album's second single, received huge success, reaching number one on the US Billboard Hot 100 chart, and becoming Brown's second number one single following "Run It!" in 2005. "With You", produced by Stargate (duo of producers known at the time for their work with R&B singer Ne-Yo), was released as the third single from Exclusive, had even bigger success than "Kiss Kiss", becoming one of the all-time best-selling singles, and reaching number two on the US Billboard Hot 100 chart. Exclusive was released in the United States on November 6, 2007. The album is musically R&B, having slight pop influences that were absent in the previous hip hop soul-influenced disc, reaching a big international success. The album debuted at number four on the US Billboard 200 chart, selling 294,000 copies in its first week, and received generally positive reviews from music critics. As of March 23, 2011, it has sold over 1.9 million copies in the United States.

In November 2007, Brown starred as a video host for St. Jude Children's Research Hospital's Math-A-Thon program. He showed his support by encouraging students to use their math skills to help children with cancer and other catastrophic diseases. On November 21, 2007, Brown appeared in This Christmas, a family drama starring Regina King. To further support the album Exclusive, Brown embarked on his The Exclusive Holiday Tour, visiting over thirty venues in United States. The tour began in Cincinnati, Ohio, on December 6, 2007, and concluded on February 9, 2008, in Honolulu, Hawaii. In March 2008, Brown was featured on Jordin Sparks' single "No Air", which had worldwide success peaked at number three on the US Billboard Hot 100 chart. He also made a guest appearance on David Banner' single "Get Like Me" alongside Yung Joc. The song peaked at number sixteen on the Billboard Hot 100, and number two on the US Hot Rap Songs chart. Brown re-released Exclusive on June 3, 2008, as a deluxe edition, renamed Exclusive: The Forever Edition, seven months after the release of the original version. The re-released version featured four new tracks, including the Eurodisco single "Forever", which became one of his most known singles, reaching number two on Billboard Hot 100. In August 2008, Brown guest-starred on Disney's The Suite Life of Zack & Cody as himself. Towards the end of 2008, Brown was named Artist of the Year by Billboard magazine.

2009–2010: Graffiti and mixtapes

In 2008, Brown began work on his third studio album, to be called Graffiti, promising to experiment with a different musical direction inspired by singers Prince and Michael Jackson. He stated, "I wanted to change it up and really be different. Like my style nowadays, I don't try to be typical urban. I want to be like how Prince, Michael and Stevie Wonder were. They can cross over to any genre of music." Following the domestic violence scandal involving the singer and Rihanna on February 8, 2009, the majority of media took positions against the singer. The incident also caused Brown to lose significant commercial contracts, including one with Doublemint. The singer later participated in numerous television appearances during the year to express himself publicly about it. Graffitis lead single "I Can Transform Ya" was released on September 29, 2009. The song peaked at number 20 on the US Billboard Hot 100 chart. "Crawl" was released as the album's second single on November 23, 2009. The song reached number 53 on the Billboard Hot 100. Graffiti was then released on December 8, 2009, featuring an R&B sound mixed with Eurodisco and rock. Brown, with this album, started to take full control of his art, managing the artistic direction, and writing every song of the album (with the exception of the song "I'll Go", written and produced by Brian Kennedy and James Fauntleroy). Brown started to be the only artistic director of all his future projects. He said that his decision to entirely direct and write his albums and songs came from the fact that he wanted to give his "own perspective of the music [he] wanted to make" and by his wanting to "verbalize whatever [he] was going through". The album, compared to its two precessors, was a commercial and critical failure, debuting at number 7 on the US Billboard 200 chart, selling 102,000 copies in its first week, and receiving generally negative reviews from critics. As of March 23, 2011, it has sold 341,000 copies in the United States.

While performing a Michael Jackson Tribute at the 2010 BET Awards, Brown started to cry and fell to his knees while singing Jackson's "Man in the Mirror". The performance and his emotional turmoil resonated with several celebrities present at the ceremony, including Trey Songz, Diddy and Taraji P. Henson. Songz said, "He left his heart on the stage. He gave genuine emotion. I was proud of him and I was happy for him for having that moment". Michael's brother, Jermaine Jackson, expressed similar sentiments stating, "it was very emotional for me, because it was an acceptance from his fans from what has happened to him and also paying tribute to my brother". Later during the award ceremony, Brown stated, "I let y'all down before, but I won't do it again...I promise", while accepting the award for the AOL Fandemonium prize. In August 2010, Brown starred alongside an ensemble cast, including Matt Dillon, Paul Walker, Idris Elba, Hayden Christensen and T.I. in the crime thriller Takers, and also served as executive producer of the film.

During 2010 Brown released the 3 free mixtapes In My Zone (Rhythm & Streets), Fan of a Fan (collaborative mixtape with Tyga), and In My Zone 2, which featured a new style of writing with grown themes, and a different musical style, mixing R&B with hip hop. For the mixtapes he worked with new producers, most notably Kevin McCall. The mixtapes were highly appreciated by the artist's loyal audience, consolidating it. The single "Deuces", extracted from the Fan of a Fan mixtape, obtained critical acclaim, also achieving a good success, peaking at number 1 on the Hot R&B/Hip-Hop Songs. The song was later remixed by the biggest names in the hip-hop scene of that time, including Drake, Kanye West, André 3000, Rick Ross, Fabolous, and T.I. He later released the solo track "No BS" as his second single from Fan of a Fan, and decided to include the two singles from the mixtape as anticipation singles for his next album.

2011–2012: F.A.M.E. and Fortune

In September 2010 Brown announced his album, F.A.M.E. [backronym for "Forgiving All My Enemies"], releasing in October the first official single from the album, "Yeah 3x", a dance-pop song, different from his previous songs on the urban mixtapes. The single received enormous international success and entered the top-ten in eleven countries, including Australia, Austria, Denmark, Ireland, Netherlands, New Zealand, Switzerland and the United Kingdom.. It was succeeded by the hip-hop single "Look at Me Now", featuring rappers Lil Wayne and Busta Rhymes, that reached number one on the US Hot R&B/Hip-Hop Songs chart, where it remained for eight consecutive weeks. It also reached number one on the US Hot Rap Songs chart. The single became the best-selling rap song of 2011, as well as one of all-time best-selling singles in the United States.

Brown's fourth studio album F.A.M.E. was first released on March 18, 2011. The album debuted at number one on the US Billboard 200 chart, with first-week sales of 270,000 copies, giving Brown his first number-one album in the United States. The album's third single, "Beautiful People", featuring Benny Benassi, peaked at number one on the US Hot Dance Club Songs chart, and became the first number-one single on the chart for both Brown and Benassi. "She Ain't You" was released as the album's fourth US single, while "Next 2 You", featuring Canadian recording artist Justin Bieber, served as the album's fourth international single. To further promote the album, Brown embarked on his F.A.M.E. Tour in Australia and North America.

Brown received six nominations at the 2011 BET Awards and ultimately won five awards, including Best Male R&B Artist, Viewers Choice Award, The Fandemonium Award, Best Collaboration and Video of the Year for "Look at Me Now". He also won three awards at the 2011 BET Hip Hop Awards, including the People's Champ Award, Reese's Perfect Combo Award and Best Hip Hop Video for "Look at Me Now". At the 2011 Soul Train Music Awards, F.A.M.E. won Album of the Year. The album has also earned Brown three Grammy Award nominations at the 54th Grammy Awards for Best R&B Album, as well as Best Rap Performance and Best Rap Song for "Look at Me Now". On February 12, 2012, Brown won the Grammy Award for Best R&B Album. During the ceremony, Brown performed several songs marking his first appearance at the awards show since his conviction of felony assault.

Originally, Brown wanted F.A.M.E. to be a double-disc consistent of 25–30 tracks, but the label was contrary to that. Right before the release of F.A.M.E. Brown decided to follow his intentions in an acceptable way for the label, working on a sequel of F.A.M.E. called Fortune, that would be a whole new album that contained new material and even some tracks that didn't make the cut of the previous album, releasing it six months after it. The artist later decided to take more time to work on the album, developing it as a project of its own, with its own concept and sound being different than the one of its precedent album. On October 7, 2011, RCA Music Group announced it was disbanding Jive Records along with Arista Records and J Records. With the shutdown, Brown (and all other artists previously signed to these three labels) will release future material on the RCA Records brand. Brown's fifth studio album Fortune was released on July 3, 2012. The album debuted atop the Billboard 200, but received negative reviews from critics. "Strip", featuring Kevin McCall, was released as the album's buzz single, with "Turn Up the Music" released as the lead single, and "Sweet Love", "Till I Die", "Don't Wake Me Up" and "Don't Judge Me" released as the album's following singles, respectively. To further promote the album, Brown embarked on his Carpe Diem Tour in Europe, Africa, Asia, and Trinidad.

2013–2015: X and Royalty

After concluding his Carpe Diem Tour in 2012, Brown's next studio album started to develop. On February 15, 2013, the singer unofficially released the song "Home", with an official videoclip, where he expresses a reflection on the bitter price of fame, and on how the only moment of respite from that thought is when he returns to the neighborhood where he grew up with people who knew him from the start. On March 26, 2013, Brown announced the release of X, in various interviews and listening sessions, releasing the song "Fine China" as the album lead single. In an interview with Ebony, when Brown spoke of taking his music in a different direction and changing his sound from pop-infused and sexually explicit of the previous album Fortune, to a more mature, soulful and vulnerable theme for the album. On March 29, 2013, he released "Fine China" as the lead single of the album.

Following the dropping of two other anticipation singles off X, "Don't Think They Know" and "Love More", on August 9, 2013, at 1:09 am PDT, Brown was reported to have suffered a seizure from Record Plant Studios in Hollywood, California as a 9-1-1 call was made. When paramedics arrived, Brown allegedly refused to receive treatment and also refused to be transported to the local hospital. (Brown has reportedly suffered from seizures since his childhood.) The next day, Brown's representative reported the seizure was caused by "intense fatigue and extreme emotional stress, both due to the continued onslaught of unfounded legal matters and the nonstop negativity." On November 20, 2013, Brown was sentenced to an anger management rehabilitation center for three months, putting the December 2013 release of X in jeopardy. To "hold [fans] over until [the X album] drops," Brown released a mixtape, titled X Files on November 19, 2013. On February 22, 2014, it was announced that the album would be released on Brown's birthday, May 5, 2014. On April 14, 2014, Brown released a teaser of the new track "Don't Be Gone Too Long" featuring Ariana Grande. However, following Brown's arrest for felony assault in Washington, D.C., on October 27, 2013, the song and album were again delayed due to Brown's prison sentence. While incarcerated, "Loyal" was released as the album's fourth single, becoming one of his most successful songs, by peaking at the top 10 on the US Billboard Hot 100 and in the United Kingdom. On August 3, 2014, Chris announced via Instagram that the album's release date will be on September 16, 2014. On August 6, 2014, the album cover was revealed. The song ended up being never released as a single, instead "New Flame" featuring Usher and Rick Ross was later released as the album's final single. The title track "X" was released as an instant-gratification track alongside the album pre-order on iTunes on August 25, 2014.

Brown's sixth studio album, X was released on September 16, 2014. The album received positive reviews from critics, who celebrated the record's sound and Brown's vocal performances. The album was considered a big improvement compared to its critically panned predecessor Fortune. At the 2015 Grammy Awards, the album was nominated for the Best Urban Contemporary Album, while "New Flame" was nominated for Best R&B Performance and Best R&B Song. Commercially, the album debuted at number two on the US Billboard 200 selling 146,000 copies in its first week, becoming his first album to miss the summit of the chart since Graffiti (2009) and his third album to go to number two on the chart overall following Exclusive (2007). It also became his sixth consecutive top ten debut in the United States. By the end of 2015, the album had sold 404,000 copies in the United States. It has been certified double platinum by the Recording Industry Association of America (RIAA). Pushing the promotion for the album further, Brown performed and appeared at several televised music events and music festivals across the United States.

On February 24, 2015, Brown released his first collaborative studio album with Tyga, titled Fan of a Fan: The Album. The album was a follow-up to the pairs 2010 mixtape Fan of a Fan. In early 2015, Brown also embarked on his Between The Sheets Tour with Trey Songz. Also in February 2015, Brown said during an interview for The Breakfast Club that he started working on the album going for a direction that would've been the sound predominant overseas. A couple months later he discovered that he had a daughter and simultaneously broke up with his ex-girlfriend Karrueche Tran. That happening made him change the idea for the album, ending up doing mostly R&B songs that he described as "representations of where i was in my life at that point", contemporarily starting his One Hell of a Nite Tour.

In spring of 2015, Brown was featured on DJ Deorro's song "Five More Hours", which received an excellent worldwide success. On June 24, Brown released a new song titled "Liquor". Shortly after, it was announced that "Liquor" was the first single from his seventh studio album. On August 22, 2015, the singer officially declares from his Twitter profile that the new album will be titled "Royalty" in honor of his daughter, Royalty Brown. On October 16 he has revealed the album cover, portraying Chris with Royalty in her arms in a black and white picture. On October 13, 2015, Brown announced that Royalty will be released on November 27, 2015. After it was revealed that the album has been pushed back to December 18, 2015, in exchange on November 27, 2015, he released a free 34-track mixtape called Before the Party as a prelude to Royalty, which features guest appearances from Rihanna, Wiz Khalifa, Pusha T, Wale, Tyga, French Montana and Fetty Wap. On October 16, 2015, the album cover was revealed. The album was released on December 18, 2015, and it debuted at number 3 on the US Billboard 200, selling 184,000 units (162,000 in pure album sales) in its first week, marking an improvement over Brown's last three studio albums. It also became his seventh solo album consecutive top ten debut in the United States.

2016–2017: Heartbreak on a Full Moon
                                                                                                                     
Brown started working and recording tracks for his next album few weeks before the release of Royalty, in late 2015. On January 10, 2016, Brown had previewed 11 unreleased songs on his Periscope and Instagram profiles, showing him dancing and lip-synching these songs. In March 2016, he collaborated again with the Italian DJ Benny Benassi for the song "Paradise" from the album Danceaholic. On May 3 he announced the single "Grass Ain't Greener", showing its cover art and announcing it as the first single from a new album titled Heartbreak on a Full Moon. The single was released on May 5, 2016. On July 7, 2016, after 2016 shooting of Dallas police officers, Brown released on his SoundCloud page two piano ballads, "My Friend" and "A Lot of Love", saying that the songs are "released for free for anybody dealing with injustice or struggle in their lives." In 2016 he released two collaborative mixtapes with his OHB crew, Before the Trap: Nights in Tarzana and Attack the Block, where they rap and sing about a reckless lifestyle full of drugs, sexual encounters with numerous untrustworthy easy women, also illustrating a dangerous street life filled with guns, dirty money and luxurious cars. 

Throughout 2016 and 2017 he kept on sharing several snippets from songs that he was working for the album and features. He worked on the album heavily during 2016 and 2017, during two tours as well, the European leg of the One Hell of a Nite Tour and The Party Tour, also building a recording studio inside of his home to record songs for the album. On December 16, 2016, he released the second official single from the album, "Party", that features guest vocals from American R&B singer Usher and rapper Gucci Mane, getting a good commercial success. The singer, while working on the album, realized that he had done too many songs that he thought were quality records that followed perfectly the narrative of the album to make a 15/20 track album, so he decided that he wanted to take it to the next level by working on it as a 40-track album. RCA Records, the record label of the singer, initially wasn't agreeable of satisfying Brown's intentions to make a 40-track album, thinking that it would've damaged its commercial performance, but the singer ended up convincing them. In February 2017 he announced that his previously teased song "Privacy" would have been released as the next single from Heartbreak on a Full Moon. The single was released on March 24, 2017, and received an excellent response from his core audience. On June 7 he released Welcome to My Life, a self-documentary focused on his life and career, directed by Andrew Sandler. Numerous celebrities participated in the movie, making statements and sharing stories about the artist. Among them there are Jennifer Lopez, Mike Tyson, Rita Ora, Usher and Tyga.

On August 4, 2017, he released the album's fourth single "Pills & Automobiles", that features guest vocals from American trap artists Yo Gotti, A Boogie Wit Da Hoodie and Kodak Black. Then on August 14, 2017, he announced the release of the fifth official single from the album, "Questions", on August 16, announcing the album release date, saying that it would be released on October 31, 2017. On October 13, 2017, Brown released the promotional single "High End", that features guest vocals from American trap artists Future and Young Thug, announcing the final tracklist of the album. On October 25, 2017, Brown organized with Tidal a free pop-up concert in New York City to perform the singles on the album and promote it for his fans.

Heartbreak on a Full Moon was eventually released as a double-disc album on October 31, 2017, via digital retailers and onto CD, three days later by RCA Records. The album's sound has been as dark and soulful. The songs on it show every emotional aspect of what's been on the singer's mind after a heavy breakup. Its themes include regret, love transforming into hate, the difficulty in managing emotions, the impossibility of getting over someone, and how a reckless lifestyle can't numb the pain of a heartbreak. Its lyrical content was inspired by Brown's breakup with Karrueche Tran. Heartbreak on a Full Moon received widespread acclaim from critics, who celebrated the record's variety, its length, and its introspective lyrical content. Many defined it as the singer's best body of work. Despite being counted for only three days of sales, Heartbreak on a Full Moon debuted at number three on the US Billboard 200, becoming Brown's ninth consecutive top 10 album on the chart. One week after its release Heartbreak on a Full Moon was certified gold by the Recording Industry Association of America for combined sales and album-equivalent units of over 500,000 units in the United States, and Brown became the first R&B male artist that went gold in a week since Usher's Confessions in 2004. In 2019 the album has been certified Double Platinum by the Recording Industry Association of America (RIAA).

On December 13, 2017, he released a 12-track surprise deluxe edition of the album called Cuffing Season – 12 Days of Christmas as a Christmas present for his fans. The deluxe edition is made off Brown's favorite leftovers of the album and few holiday-themed songs. Brown eventually embarked on his US "Heartbreak on a Full Moon Tour" in June 2018 to further promote the album. The opening acts for the tour were 6lack, H.E.R., Rich the Kid, and Jacquees.

2018–2019: Indigo
                                                                                                             
Following the overall success of Heartbreak on a Full Moon, Brown and rapper Joyner Lucas announced a collaboration project, titled Angels & Demons on February 25, 2018, with the release of the single "Stranger Things". However the project ended up never being released. On March 15, 2018, Brown was featured in Lil Dicky's smash hit single "Freaky Friday". By April 9, 2018, the video had reached over 100 million views and topped the charts in New Zealand and the United Kingdom.

After drafting the concept for his new album, in August 2018, at the end of the "Heartbreak On A Full Moon tour", Brown started the actual processing work of his ninth album, Indigo. On January 4, 2019, Brown released "Undecided", the first single off it, alongside a video for the song. "Undecided" saw Brown reunite with producer Scott Storch, who previously worked with Brown in 2005 on his breakout hit "Run It!". The single marked Brown's first release after signing an extension and a new license agreement with RCA Records, that gave him the owning of his master recordings, making him one of the youngest artists to do so at the age of 29. On April 11, he released the second single off the album titled "Back to Love", that received positive reviews from music critics who celebrated its lyrical content and its production, but it failed to chart in the US. The third single, "Wobble Up", was released a week later featuring Nicki Minaj and G-Eazy, announcing that the album is expected to be released in June. On April 25, he appeared on a track with Marshmello and Tyga called "Light It Up". In an announcement on May 2, Brown revealed the list of artists he had been working with for his album, Nicki Minaj, Tory Lanez, Tyga, Justin Bieber, Juicy J, Juvenile, H.E.R, Tank, Sage the Gemini, Lil Jon, Lil Wayne, Joyner Lucas, Gunna and Drake were included on the list. Some of these collaborations were surprising to the media, especially Drake, due to their public feud that lasted for several years. He later revealed the artwork of the album and its track list between May and June 2019. On May 31, he appeared on "Easy", a successful single where he duetted with singer DaniLeigh. On June 8, Brown released "No Guidance" featuring Drake as a single. It debuted at number nine on the US Billboard Hot 100, making it Brown's 15th top-ten song, and later peaked at number five. The single won Best Collaboration Performance, Best Dance Performance and Song of the Year at the 2019 Soul Train Music Awards and received a nomination for Best R&B Song at the 62nd Grammy Awards.

Indigo was eventually released on June 28, 2019, as a double album, marking Brown's second album to be released in this style. The disc is an R&B and tropical-pop album, about vibrations, spiritual love and sex, that leaves the introspective, dark and sultry mood of Heartbreak on a Full Moon, for a way more lighthearted sound and tone. In the United States, Indigo debuted at number one on the US Billboard 200 with 108,000 album-equivalent units, which included 28,000 pure album sales in its first week, making it his third number-one album in the country. The album was met with positive reviews from critics. Indigo spawned two other singles, "Heat", which topped the Billboard Rhythmic Airplay chart, and earned Brown his 13th number one on the chart, and second during 2019, and "Don't Check on Me", that features vocals from Justin Bieber and vocalist Atia "Ink" Boggs. On October 4, 2019, Brown eventually released a deluxe version of Indigo entitled Indigo Extended, which included 10 additional songs, making the extended version a total of 42 songs.

On June 10, 2019, Brown announced an official headlining concert tour where he performed the album throughout United States, titled "Indigoat Tour". The tour began on August 20, and ended on October 19. The tour was received with very good responses by journalists, that praised its stage settings, and Brown's dancing abilities. "Indigoat Tour" grossed over $30,100,000 in its 37 shows, selling out most of the venues. Brown was ranked 3rd in the Billboard top R&B/Hip-Hop artists of the decade for the 2010s, behind peers Rihanna and Drake in 2nd and 1st, respectively.

2020present: Breezy
                                                                   
In December 2019, Brown revealed that he started working on new material for his tenth studio album. Later, on April 29, 2020, Brown announced the release of a collaborative mixtape with Young Thug, Slime & B. The mixtape was released on May 5, 2020, and features the hit single "Go Crazy", which peaked at number 3 on the Billboard Hot 100, becoming Brown's first song to spend one full year on the chart. In April 2021, "Go Crazy" broke the record for the longest running No. 1 song on R&B/Hip-Hop Airplay, a record that was previously held by Brown's 2019 hit single "No Guidance". On May 1, 2020, Brown was featured on Drake's Dark Lane Demo Tapes mixtape on the track "Not You Too". The song earned Brown his 100th career entry on the US Billboard Hot 100, as it entered and debuted at number 25.

On July 9, 2020, Brown announced via Instagram that the title of his tenth album would be Breezy, a reference to his stage nickname. No release date has been announced yet. Brown said in July 2021, while working on the album, that he wanted to make some "really endearing music" that "talk to women's soul". On August 2, 2021, he announced on his Instagram that his Breezy album would be accompanied by a short film of the same name. Later on December 18, 2021, he said that the lead single of Breezy would be released during January 2022. On January 14, 2022, he released the single "Iffy", which peaked to #1 of the Rhythmic Radio Chart on April 3, 2022. "Iffy" ended up not being included on the album. On March 15, 2022, Brown shared a snippet of a second single entitled "Warm Embrace" on his Instagram account with the caption "Is this the BREEZY you've been waiting for?". The song has a more traditional R&B sound and is set to be released on April 1. On March 16, 2022, Brown took to his Instagram account to tease a new joint tour for Summer 2022 with a mystery co-headliner, which will coincide the rollout of the album. On April 1, 2022, Brown released the official audio for his second single "WE (Warm Embrace)" on all streaming platforms. The record is produced by Don City and sees Brown go back to his R&B roots, as he samples Guy's '90s hit "Let's Chill". On April 26, 2022, Brown announced that the mystery co-headliner for his summer tour titled One of Them Ones is rapper Lil Baby. The tour will include 27 stops in North American and is set to kick off on July 15. Brown performed at Drai's After Hours Nightclub at The Cromwell Las Vegas Hotel and Casino on June 11, 2022 in Las Vegas marking the launch of his new multi-year residency at the venue.

On June 17, 2022, one week ahead of the album release, Brown released the audio for an Afrobeats-infused collaboration with Wizkid titled "Call Me Every Day". The song was co-produced by DJ Tunez, Blaise Beatz and Leon Youngblood. On June 21, 2022, Brown released a music video for the single "WE (Warm Embrace)". The video included a guest appearance and dance sequence with fellow R&B artist Normani and teased a sneak peak of an album track titled "Sleep at Night". On June 24, 2022, Brown released a music vdeo for “C.A.B. (Catch A Body)” featuring rapper Fivio Foreign. The neon-glowing visual finds the two men sipping red cups, driving foreign cars, and enjoying a night out on the town. The video was directed by Damien Sandoval and coincided with the release date of the Breezy album. On August 22, 2022, Brown took to social media to state that there is a strong possibility his North American co-headlined tour with Lil Baby would be expanding to Europe. On August 24, 2022, Brown released a music video his single "Call Me Every Day" featuring Wizkid. The video which was directed by Child finds a woman taking a bath before she starts daydreaming about Brown and Wizkid. She's then transported to an African village where the Virginia native links up with the Nigerian megastar to celebrate Black beauty. The video also captures interactions with Brown and his backup dancer Taylor Terry, as well as the singer grooving with his longtime backup dancers. At the final stop of Brown's One of Them One's tour in Las Vegas, he renuinted with American Idol winner Jordin Sparks for a nostalgic performance of their duet "No Air" nearly 15 years after it release.

On September 4, 2022, Brown won international artiste of the year at the 15th annual Headies awards. The category is designed for non-African artists or groups with outstanding achievements and impact on Afrobeats. In September 2022, with the single release of "Under the Influence", Brown became the first R&B singer in history to chart over fifty top 40 hits on the Billboard Hot 100 chart. On October 14, 2022, Brown appeared as a special guest at Usher's Las Vegas Residency to perform a few songs, including Back to Sleep (Remix), Under the Influence and Heat. During the show Usher took a moment to give Brown his flowers. “I love you. You a great. You're a legend. We love you and we gon’ continue to keep lifting you up,” said Usher. On November 16, 2022, Brown released two Christmas themed standalone singles titled "No Time Like Christmas" and "It's Giving Christmas" and later dropped visuals for the singles in December. On November 18, 2022, Brown took to his Instagram page to announce that the American Music Awards had canceled his scheduled tribute performance to Michael Jackson in celebration of the 40th anniversay of the later singer's 1982 Thriller album. Brown also shared rehearsal footage of the cancelled tribute and stated the performance was cancelled for unknown reasons. The cancelled tribute prompted backlash against the AMAs from fans and industry peers alike. Jermaine Dupri stated the decision to pull the tribute signals something grave for celebration of Black Music stating that "If the American Music Awards canceled the Chris Brown performance, then that means they canceled the 40th anniversay of Thriller. Which means they canceled the Michael jackson tribute. Black Music, we in trouble." Similarly John Branca, the co-executor of the Michael Jackson Estate stated that the AMAs should be ashamed of themselves and that the cancellation is an attack on Black Music. On December 9, 2022, Brown announced a European tour for 2023 titled the "Under The Infuence" tour with artist Skillibeng as a special guest. Within minutes, the entire 19-show tour sold out, including four nights at London's renowned O2 Arena, two nights at Accor Arena in Paris, two nights at Ziggo Dome in Amsterdam and more. In January 2023, Brown surpassed Elvis Presley for the most RIAA Gold Certified Singles among all male vocalists in history, after previously passing Presley for the most Billboard Hot 100 entries among all male vocalists.

Artistry

Influences

Brown has cited a number of artists as his inspiration, predominantly Michael Jackson. Brown emphasizes "Michael Jackson is the reason why I do music and why I am an entertainer." In "Fine China", he exemplifies Jackson's influence both musically and visually as Ebony magazine's Britini Danielle asserted that the song was "reminiscent of Michael Jackson's Off the Wall". Choreographically, MTV noticed that it "takes distinct visual cues from classic clips like 'Smooth Criminal' and 'Beat It'", while Billboard complimented his appearance by calling it "a modern way to channel the King of Pop". Usher is also another influence who comes across as a more contemporary figure for Brown. He tells Vibe magazine "He was the one who the youngsters looked up to. I know that we, in the dancing and singing world, looked up to him", and maintains "If it wasn't for Usher, then Chris Brown couldn't exist". Other influences include Marvin Gaye, Sam Cooke, Ginuwine, Phil Collins, Bobby Brown and R. Kelly. When it comes to his rapping he cited Naughty by Nature, Tupac, Lil' Wayne and Rakim as the rappers he's inspired by.

Musical style 
Music critics have commended Brown's introduction to R&B, recognizing his versatility, and considering him an evolver of the genre. His musical style has often been defined as polyhedric. Lyana Robertson of Vibe says "As traditional R&B flourished around him, the young singer began an evolution of the genre". She saw his debut single "Run It!" as a "prelude to what Brown would continue to do for the next decade: relentlessly disrupt the constructs of rhythm and blues." By his second album Exclusive, she says he was "tapping more electric up-tempos, swimming deep in hip-hop waters and annihilating the pop arena". Describing the Grammy Award winning F.A.M.E. as "his most diverse offering to date", she remarked "There was no level of musical flexibility comparable. There still isn't." F.A.M.E. is considered to be the album that defined Brown's musical style and persona.

Brown is considered to be, by a big part of critics and general public, the biggest R&B artist of the 2010s, with Andy Kellman of AllMusic crediting him as the "spearhead" of the genre during the period. Brad Wete of Billboard said that his sixth album X showcased "the height of his musical talents", while cultural critic and media personality Joe Budden defined his 2017 album Heartbreak on a Full Moon as "one of the greatest things ever happened to R&B music".

Genres

Brown made his sound mixing the traditional sound of R&B adding different influences to it, most importantly hip hop and pop, but also several other genres in different songs, such as soul, dancehall, alternative R&B, house, EDM, afropop, trap, rock, disco and funk. The multitude of genres influencing his music can be heard in many of his singles, like "Deuces", "Sweet Love", "Liquor", "Zero", "Back to Love" or "Don't Check on Me". His pure side of R&B is densely shown on every album that he has done, even after that his music started to be more tinged from other genres, with some examples being "No BS", "Don't Judge Me", "Back To Sleep" and "Privacy".

Throughout his career Brown has always had a strong influence from hip hop in his music, and following his 2010 mixtapes, he approached the genre differently, starting to rap frequently on mixtapes and features, adding to his albums straight hip-hop songs like "Look at Me Now", "Till I Die" and "Loyal", or by doing performances that switch from his R&B singing to his rapping, like he did in several tracks from his album Heartbreak on a Full Moon.  His dance-pop side in the single "Forever" off his second album Exclusive opened the door for many other Europop songs like "Yeah 3x", "Beautiful People", "Turn Up The Music" and "Don't Wake Me Up", but it began to be less present in his music starting from his album X.

Themes
Brown's lyrical production is typically considered to be "emotional" or "hedonistic". His songs mainly cover themes of sex, lovesickness, regret, romantic love, desire, fast life, and internal conflict, also having some introspections over loneliness and the dark side of fame. Along with his vocal and dancing abilities, his songwriting is considered to be one of the things that distincts him for the better compared to other R&B singers of his time. American media executive and radio personality Ebro Darden stated that Brown is the "most all-around talented person in R&B. Trey Songz is talented, but he can't dance like Chris Brown. Usher is probably the only one that could come close to him, but he doesn't have the songwriting abilities that Chris Brown has".

Brown said in 2013, during an interview for Rolling Stone, that his songs are always "derived from personal experiences. Then again, I always like mixing reality with art."

Voice
Brown possesses a light lyric tenor voice, which spans three and a half octaves, rising from the bass F♯ (F2) to its peak at the soprano C♯.(C♯6) His vocal ability was first recognized by his mother at a young age, as Brown tells People magazine "I was 11 and watching Usher perform 'My Way', and I started trying to mimic it. My mom was like, 'You can sing?' And I was like, 'Well, yeah, Mama.'" subsequently leading to the start of his career. "Take You Down" most notably earned him a Grammy award nomination for Best Male R&B Vocal Performance in 2009.

His vocal performances are characterized by his harmonization, timbre, vocal runs and soulfulness. While his voice on his first two albums, Chris Brown and Exclusive, was considered to be "honeyed", due to his young age, with subsequent projects like Graffiti and F.A.M.E. it was noted for maturing to a "more mature, distinctive and melodious voice", with Brown "coming into his own as a singer". On F.A.M.E. critics noted huge flexibility in his voice, with Steve Jones of USA Today praising the singer's ability to "give top notch vocal performances in R&B, Europop, rap, rock and acoustic records". X and Indigo were noted for displaying his timbre, exemplifying his singing performances.

His harmonizing was found by Andrew Unterberger of Billboard to be notably shown on his songs "Liquor" and "Go Crazy". On "Another Round", "Don't Judge Me" and "It Won't Stop" he did what was considered by Lee Hildebrand of San Francisco Chronicle to be "some of the most soothing and smooth singing of his discography". Jake Indiana of Highsnobiety said that his feature on Kanye West's song "Waves" is one of his best vocal performances, and that it "sounds like ascending to heaven with a choir of angels at your back". The singer was particularly noted for his emotional singing that illustrated his vocal range on songs like "Covered In You", "Lost & Found", "No Guidance" and "Red". On tracks like "Look at Me Now", "No Romeo No Juliet" and "Stranger Things" he displayed his ability of fast-rapping.

Dancing 

Brown's dancing abilities and stage presence are widely praised, receiving broad comparisons to those of Michael Jackson. According to Brown, he taught himself how to dance by imitating Jackson's moves since childhood, then developing his own distinct style throughout his career. Most of his music videos feature complex choreographies, including the "futuristic" "Turn Up the Music", the Jackson-inspired choreography of "Fine China", "Zero", where he displayed different dancing styles, including popping and his signature spin move, "Party", where he showcased his remarked footwork, and "Heat", described by The Source as a "silky smooth choreography that shows Brown's unmatchable dancing talent in the classiest way". Some of his most notable dancing live performances include his "Thriller" recreation at the 2006 World Music Awards, his medley at the 2011 MTV Video Music Awards, where he performed a choreography that included flying parts, and his 2015 freestyled dancing over Future's "March Madness" at the Vestival The Hague Malieveld, that included a highly acclaimed front-flip, done with no hands by standing still, landed perfectly on beat.

In films such as Stomp the Yard and Battle of the Year, Brown displayed his ability to breakdance while in-character.

Street art
Aside from his musical career, he was noted for markedly producing graffiti art. His visual works have been described as "manga-inspired" and "abstract". Brown said that he painted since his childhood, saying "my first approach with it was painting school walls" saying that he's always been captivated by the fact that drawing and painting "gives you the chance to express yourself in whatever way, showing to the world your own dimension".

Brown has produced street art under the pseudonym Konfused, partnering with street artist Kai to produce works for the Miami Basel. The singer painted the buildings of different radio stations such as Hot 97. In 2015 he worked on some of the walls of The Grammy Museum, mixing his spray paint drawings with images of James Brown, Prince, Michael Jackson and himself. Brown has made graffiti works for different cities worldwide, including Los Angeles, London and Amsterdam.

His painting and dancing skills were shown at the same time when Brown, partnering with Spotify's Rap Caviar, painted Heartbreak on a Full Moons album cover, mostly from dancing around the canvas. In 2020 he painted a mural in memory of Kobe Bryant, doing a portray that includes Kobe's face, a mamba, and a few pictures of Kobe dribbling and dunking a basketball.

Personal life

Relationships
From 2007 to 2009, Brown dated singer Rihanna until their highly publicized domestic violence case. His emotional state following the happening was theme of a big part of his album Graffiti. In 2009, Brown was linked with Girlicious singer Natalie Mejia after the pair were spotted leaving a tattoo parlor together. However Brown and Mejia later denied the report claiming they were only friends.  In 2009, Brown reunited with an ex-girlfriend by the name of Erica Jackson from his hometown in Virginia. In 2010, Brown dated R&B singer Rhea who used to be a part of fellow Virginia native Pharrell's group N.E.R.D. Later in 2010, Brown dated Sports Illustrated model Jasmine Sanders. Brown and Sanders also reuinted briefly in 2019. In 2011, Brown dated model Draya Michele who stated that Brown was a great boyfriend in spite of the public perception against him. Despite their split Brown and Michele have remained friends over the years. In 2011, Brown began dating Karrueche Tran, whom he had met while she was working in a retail store. In October 2012, Brown announced that he ended his relationship with Tran because he did not "want to see her hurt over my friendship with Rihanna." The day after the announcement, Brown released a video entitled "The Real Chris Brown", which features images of himself, Tran, and Rihanna, as Brown wonders, "Is there such thing as loving two people? I don't know if it's possible, but I feel like that."

In February 2012, Rihanna and Brown dropped surprise remixes to their singles Turn Up The Music and Birthday Cake, which all but alluded to a reconciliation. In January 2013, Rihanna confirmed that she and Brown had resumed their romantic relationship, stating, "It's different now. We don't have those types of arguments anymore. We talk about shit. We value each other. We know exactly what we have now, and we don't want to lose that." Speaking of Brown, Rihanna also said, "He's not the monster everybody thinks. He's a good person. He has a fantastic heart. He's giving and loving. And he's fun to be around. That's what I love about him – he always makes me laugh. All I want to do is laugh, really – and I do that with him". Rihanna and Brown collaborated again on a duet song off Rihanna's Unapologetic album titled Nobody's Business. In a May 2013 interview, Brown stated that he and Rihanna had broken up again. He subsequently reunited with Tran, but they parted ways following confirmation of Brown's daughter with Nia Guzman in 2015. His breakup with Tran inspired several songs off his albums Royalty and Heartbreak on a Full Moon. Later in 2015, Brown was rumored to be dating British Pop Singer Rita Ora. In 2017, Brown dated model Vanessa Vargas. Later in 2017 and 2018, Brown dated Indonesian pop singer Agnez Mo. Brown and Mo also released a single together entitled "Overdose". In 2019, Brown dated model Indya Marie who he had met while filming a music video with Eric Bellinger for their collaboration Type a Way.

Religion
When discussing his upbringing, Brown stated: "We were used to two pairs of shoes for a school year. We used to go to church every day. I was one of those kids that had more church clothes than school clothes." He has also discussed his second work of grace, saying that "he experienced the Holy Ghost while performing 'His Eye Is on the Sparrow' in church". After being released from jail on June 2, 2014, Brown wrote that he was "Humbled and Blessed" and tweeted the words "Thank you GOD."

In 2015, he said during an interview for Vibe, that God is the only thing that he's afraid of. Speaking about prayers he said "I pray everyday, I think we pray unconsciously too. Personally I don't pray for success. I pray for knowledge for understanding and peace of mind. I really try to pray for that because it's a big world, and you can get wrapped up in it trying to please every city. So I just try to get a peace of mind and me understanding that being at peace with my flaws and my talents. I'm cool with that. That's why I think once He shows me certain things, or even the choices that I make, and decisions that I make that are healthy for me. He shows me the right path. When I bless other people, He always blesses me. It's not even about a self-serving journey; it's about just learning. I want to learn people's experiences. I want to give them experiences too."

Legal issues

Domestic violence incident with Rihanna

At around 12:30 a.m. (PST) on February 8, 2009, Brown and his then-girlfriend, singer Rihanna, had an argument which escalated into physical violence, leaving Rihanna with visible severe facial injuries which required hospitalization. Brown turned himself in to the Los Angeles Police Department's Wilshire station at 6:30 p.m. (PST) and was booked under suspicion of making criminal threats. On June 22, 2009, Brown pleaded guilty to a felony and accepted a plea deal of community labor, five years of probation, and domestic violence counseling. On August 25, Brown received five years of probation. He was ordered to attend one year of domestic violence counseling and undergo six months of community service; the judge retained a five-year restraining order on Brown, which required him to remain 50 yards (45.72 meters) away from Rihanna, reduced to 10 yards at public events.  On September 2, 2009, Brown spoke about the domestic violence case in a pre-recorded Larry King Live interview, his first public interview about the matter. He was accompanied to the interview by his mother, Joyce Hawkins, and attorney Mark Geragos, as he discussed growing up in a household with his mother being repeatedly assaulted by his stepfather. Brown said of hearing details of his assault of Rihanna, "I'm in shock, because, first of all, that's not who I am as a person, and that's not who I promise I want to be." In February 2011, at the request of Brown's and Rihanna's lawyers, Mark Geragos and Donald Eltra, Judge Patricia Schnegg modified the restraining order to a "level one order", allowing both singers to appear at awards shows together in the future.

On July 11, 2012, Brown's community service was evaluated and he was ordered to meet a judge. The evaluation was ordered by Superior Court Judge Patricia Schnegg on July 10, 2012. He was scheduled to appear in court with regard to the evaluation on August 21, 2012. While conducting his community service in Virginia, however, Brown was tested positive for cannabis and appeared in court on September 25, 2012, at which time his hearing date was changed to November, to determine whether or not he had violated the terms of his court order. On March 20, 2015, Brown's probation ended, formally closing the felony case emanating from the Rihanna assault which happened over six years prior.

In a 2017 self-documentary, Welcome to My Life, Brown goes into detail about the abusive relationship, saying he intended to marry Rihanna, but that she lost trust in him after finding out that he lied about a prior relationship someone who worked with him. Brown also provided a detailed description on how the known fight went down.

Other legal issues 
On June 14, 2012, Drake and his entourage were involved in a scuffle with Brown at a nightclub called WIP in the SoHo neighborhood of New York City. About eight people were injured during the brawl, including San Antonio Spurs star Tony Parker, who had to have surgery to remove a piece of glass from his eye. Drake was not arrested. Brown's attorney alleged Drake was the instigator. Brown himself tweeted about the incident and publicly criticized Drake weeks later.

In January 2013, Brown was involved in an altercation with Frank Ocean over a parking space, outside a recording studio in West Hollywood. Police officers in Los Angeles said that Brown was under investigation, describing the incident as "battery" due to Brown allegedly punching Ocean. Although Ocean alleged that Brown had threatened to shoot him, he said he would not press charges. Fellow artist Sean Kingston who was present at the scene alleged that Ocean and his cousin instigated the incident and were at fault. Brown later sued Ocean and his cousin for the incident and the matter was eventually settled out of court.

In July 2013, Brown's probation was revoked after he was involved in an alleged hit-and-run in Los Angeles. He was released from court and was scheduled to reappear in August 2013, to learn whether or not he would serve time in prison. The charges would later be dropped, but Brown would have 1,000 additional hours of community service added to his probation terms. In October 2013, Brown was arrested for felony assault in Washington, D.C., after refusing to take a picture with a man, and throwing a punch which broke the man's nose. The charge was reduced to a misdemeanor. Brown spent 36 hours in a Washington jail and was taken to court in shackles. He was released and ordered to report to his California probation officer within 48 hours.

On October 30, 2013, Brown voluntarily decided to enter rehab. After Brown completed his 90 days, the judge ordered him to remain a resident at the Malibu treatment facility until a hearing on April 23, 2014. The deal was if Brown left rehab, he would go directly to jail. On March 14, 2014, Brown was kicked out of the rehab facility and sent to Northern Neck Regional Jail for violating internal rules. He was expected to be released on April 23, 2014, but a judge denied his release request from custody either on bail or his own recognizance. At his May 9, 2014, court date, Brown was ordered to serve 131 days in jail for his probation violation. He was sentenced to serve 365 days in custody; however, he was given credit for the 234 days he has already spent in rehab and jail.  During Brown's rehab, a probation officer noted in a letter that Brown's brushes with the law may have been caused by untreated bipolar disorder and posttraumatic stress disorder, specifically that "Mr. Brown became aggressive and acted out physically due to his untreated mental health disorder, severe sleep deprivation, inappropriate self-medicating and untreated PTSD". According to the court documents, which were received by E! News and later The Hollywood Reporter, Brown was formally diagnosed with both Bipolar II and PTSD at the unnamed rehab facility.

In the early hours of August 30, 2016, a woman called the police and falsely accused Brown of threatening her with a gun inside his house. Police were called, but Brown denied them entry without a warrant.  When they returned with one, Brown refused them entry and began what news sources referred to as a "standoff" with the LAPD, including the robbery-homicide division and SWAT team. During this time, Brown was seen posting videos on Instagram, in which he rails against the police and the media coverage of the activity at his house. He denounced media reports that he was "barricaded" inside his house, complained about the helicopters flying overhead, and called the police "idiots" and "the worst gang in the world." He said that he was innocent and "What I do care about is you are defacing  my name and my character and integrity". Brown was arrested and later released from jail on $250,000 bail. On September 1, 2016, Brown's lawyer, Mark Geragos, stated that there was no standoff and that, with regard to the LAPD search, "nothing was found to corroborate her statement." Charges were later dropped after prosecutors declined to arraign Brown on the felony charges. Brown later sued the accuser for defamation, prevailing in the lawsuit, after it was ruled that the defendant brought to court false and defamatory statements about Brown, through her incriminating text messages where she said "don't you know this freak Chris Brown is kicking me out of his house because I called his friend jewelry fake can you come get me my Uber is messing up if not I'm going to set him up and call the cops and say that he tried to shoot me and that will teach him a lesson I'm going to set his a** up." Brown later said through his social media accounts "Because of my past, my character keeps on being defaced by these fake news and allegations highlighted by the media, but I'm glad that all my real supporters know who i really am and can see the truth."

In January 2022, a woman filed a civil suit accusing Brown of raping her on a yacht in Miami in December 2020. The woman attempted to sue Brown for $20 million.  Brown denied the allegations and later submitted text messages to the Miami police department which indicated a consensual relationship with the accuser. According to TMZ, Brown plans to counter sue the accuser for defamation for making false accusations, and the accuser's lawyer dropped the case against him citing that she was unaware of the messages. The lawsuit against Brown was dropped in August 2022 due to lack of prosecution.

Business ventures
In 2007, Brown founded the record label CBE ("Chris Brown Entertainment" or "Culture Beyond Evolution"), under Interscope Records. Brown has since signed frequent collaborator Kevin McCall, singer Sabrina Antoinette, former RichGirl member Sevyn Streeter, singer-songwriter Joelle James, and rock group U.G.L.Y. However, from 2014 the label started to sign exclusively Brown's works.

Brown has stated he owns fourteen Burger King restaurants. In 2012, he launched a streetwear clothing line called Black Pyramid, in collaboration with the founders of the Pink + Dolphin clothing line. In 2016 the clothing label was set for larger release, partnering with streetwear clothing lines such as Snipes for a worldwide distribution, also being distributed through its own Black Pyramid boutiques.

On November 11, 2021, the singer launched his own cereal, "Breezy's Cosmic Crunch", partnering with SoFlo Snacks for this limited edition of collectible breakfast cereal.

Discography

Chris Brown (2005)
Exclusive (2007)
Graffiti (2009)
F.A.M.E. (2011)
Fortune (2012)
X (2014)
Royalty (2015)
Heartbreak on a Full Moon (2017)
Indigo (2019)
Breezy (2022)

Filmography

Tours
Brown has headlined multiple arenas tours in North America, Europe and World-Wide. Additionally, he has co-headlined two separate North American tours with Trey Songz and Lil Baby and served as a supporting act on tours for industry peers such as Rihanna, Drake, Lil Wayne and Beyoncé. As of 2021, Brown had earned approximately $157 million from 279 concerts over the course of his career – making him one of the highest grossing African American touring artists of all time.

Headlining
 Up Close and Personal Tour (2006)
 The UCP Exclusive Tour (2007)
 Fan Appreciation Tour (2009)
 F.A.M.E. Tour (2011)
 Carpe Diem Tour (2012)
 One Hell of a Nite Tour (2015–2016)
 The Party Tour (2017)
 Heartbreak on a Full Moon Tour (2018)
 Indigoat Tour (2019)
 Under the Influence Tour (2023)

Co-headlining
 Between the Sheets Tour  (2015)
 One of Them Ones Tour  (2022)

Supporting
 The Beyoncé Experience (Australia dates) (2007)
 Good Girl Gone Bad Tour (the Philippines, Oceania) (2008)
 Supafest (2012)
 Lil Weezyana Fest (2016)
 OVO Fest (2019)

Achievements

 List of awards and nominations received by Chris Brown

See also

 List of artists who reached number one in the United States
List of highest-certified music artists in the United States
List of best-selling music artists
List of Billboard Hot 100 chart achievements and milestones
List of most-followed Instagram accounts

References

External links
 
 
 
 Chris Brown on YouTube

 
1989 births
Living people
21st-century American criminals
21st-century American male actors
21st-century American rappers
21st-century African-American male singers
African-American businesspeople
African-American Christians
African-American male actors
African-American male dancers
African-American male rappers
African-American male singer-songwriters
American businesspeople convicted of crimes
American child singers
American contemporary R&B singers
American dance musicians
American hip hop singers
American male criminals
American male dancers
American male film actors
American male pop singers
American male television actors
American music industry executives
American music video directors
American people convicted of assault
Burger King people
Businesspeople from Virginia
Criminals from Virginia
Grammy Award winners
Jive Records artists
Male actors from Virginia
People from Tappahannock, Virginia
People from Tarzana, Los Angeles
People with bipolar disorder
Pop rappers
Rappers from Virginia
RCA Records artists
Singer-songwriters from Virginia
Singers with a three-octave vocal range
Sony BMG artists
World Music Awards winners